BWO can refer to:
BW Offshore, an FPSO owner and operator
BWO (band), a Swedish pop group formerly known as Bodies Without Organs
Body without organs, a sociological concept developed by Gilles Deleuze and Félix Guattari
Backward wave oscillator
The Blue World Order, a stable of professional wrestlers
 BWO, Blue-winged Olive mayflies used in fly fishing